The Segunda División B de Futsal formerly known as Primera Nacional A is the third professional futsal pyramid in Spain. It was founded in 1989 and is managed by the CNFS of the Royal Spanish Football Federation.

The Segunda División B de Futsal consists in 9 groups. Every group corresponds to one or two Spanish regions. There are in total 147 approx. teams. When finishing the regular season in every group, the top team of each group and the four runners-up with highest scores play the promotion playoffs to Segunda División. Conversely, the two or three bottom teams of each group are relegated to Tercera División.

By winning the promotion via playoffs doesn't necessarily mean the promotion for the winning team. Some teams are forced to give up for not meet financial requirements to play in LNFS, even having won the promotion.

From 2011–12' season onwards, Primera Nacional A will be known as Segunda División B.

2015–16 groups and teams
In Bold, 2014–15 group winners and qualified teams for promotion playoffs.

Group 1
Teams from Galicia, Castile and León and Asturias.

Group 2
Teams from Basque Country, Navarre, Aragon, La Rioja & Valencian Community

Group 3
Teams from Catalonia, Valencian Community and Balearic Islands.

Group 4
Teams from Community of Madrid, Extremadura, Castile-La Mancha and Valencian Community.

Group 5
Teams from Andalusia, Ceuta & Melilla.

Group 6
Teams from Canary Islands.

Tenerife subgroup

Las Palmas subgroup

Teams promoted by season

See also
Segunda División de Futsal
Primera División de Futsal

References

External links
Spanish Football Federation Official website

3ª